The 2015 Stanford Cardinal football team represented Stanford University in the 2015 NCAA Division I FBS football season. The Cardinal were led by fifth-year head coach David Shaw. They played their home games at Stanford Stadium and were members of the North Division of the Pac-12 Conference.

In 2015, the Cardinal were the champions of the Pac-12.  After finishing in first place in the North Division, they beat USC in the Pac-12 Championship Game by a score of 41–22.  They defeated Iowa 45–16 in the Rose Bowl on January 1, 2016.

The Cardinal finished the season ranked #3 in the final Coaches Poll, their highest final ranking in the history of that poll. They were similarly ranked #3 in the final AP Poll, their highest final ranking in 75 years, following the 1940 national championship season.

Previous season

After two consecutive Pac-12 championships, the Cardinal finished second in the North Division with an 8–5 record, ending its season by defeating Maryland in the 2014 Foster Farms Bowl.

Personnel

Coaching staff

Roster
{| class="toccolours" style="text-align: left;"
|-
| colspan=11 style="color:#FFFFFF;background:#990000; text-align: center"| 2015 Stanford Cardinal Roster
|-
|valign="top"|

Quarterbacks
 8 Kevin Hogan –  Senior (6'4, 220)
10 Keller Chryst – Sophomore (6'5, 231)
17 Ryan Burns –  Sophomore (6'5, 225)

Running backs
 5 Christian McCaffrey - Sophomore (6'0, 197)
15 Reagan Williams Freshman (6'3, 218)
19 Ryan Gaertner Junior (5'10, 215)
20 Bryce Love Freshman (5'10, 184)
22 Remound Wright –  Senior (5'9, 198)
25 Cameron Scarlett Freshman (6'1, 220)
26 Barry J. Sanders –  Junior (5'10, 191)
35 Daniel Marx – Sophomore (6'2, 247)
42 Pat McFadden – Junior (5'10, 195)

Wide receivers
 2 Trenton Irwin – Freshman (6’2, 199)
 3 Michael Rector –  Junior 6'1 190)
 4 Jay Tyler – Freshman (5'8, 167)
 5 Kodi Whitfield – Senior (6'2, 197)
 6 Francis Owusu – Junior (6'3, 193)
 6 Taijuan Thomas – Junior (5'10, 185)
11 Dontonio Jordan –  Junior (5'11, 188)
13 Rollins Stallworth –  Senior (6'4, 196)
19 J. J. Arcega-Whiteside – Freshman (6'3, 207)
21 Isaiah Brandt-Sims – Sophomore (5'11, 175)
41 Addison Johnson - Sophomore (5'9, 175)
46 Sidhart Krishnamurthi – Freshman (5'11, 175)
81 Conner Crane –  Junior (6'4, 195)
85 Treyvion Foster – Junior (6'1, 213)
89 Devon Cajuste –  Senior (6'4, 232)

Offensive Guards/Offensive tackles
51 Joshua Garnett – Senior (6'5, 317) OG
54 Nick Wilson – Freshman (6'3, 268) OG
57 Johnny Caspers –  Junior (6'4, 292) OG
60 Lucas Hinds –  Sophomore (6'4, 290) OG
62 Austin Maihen – Freshman – (6'5, 280) OG
64 David Bright –  Sophomore (6'5, 290) OG/OT
66 Nick Davidson –  Junior (6'7, 283) OT
71 Brandon Fanaika - Sophomore (6'3, 321) OG
74 Brendon Austin –  Senior (6'6, 304) OG
75 A. T. Hall – Sophomore (6'5, 278) OT
76 Jack Dreyer - Freshman (6'8, 286) OT
77 Casey Tucker – Sophomore (6'6, 305) OT
78 Kyle Murphy – Senior (6'7, 272) OT

|width="25"| 
|valign="top"|

Tight ends
 9 Dalton Schultz – Sophomore (6'6, 239)
18 Austin Hooper –  Sophomore (6'4, 225)
80 Eric Cotton –  Sophomore (6'6, 235)
82 Chris Harrell – Senior (6'4, 236)
87 Ben Snyder – Freshman (6'4, 240)
88 Greg Taboada –  Sophomore (6'5, 235)
99 Luke Kaumatule – Senior (6'7, 260)

Centers
52 Graham Shuler –  Junior (6'4, 277)
64 Brian Chaffin – Freshman (6'2, 278)
73 Jesse Burkett -  Freshman (6'4, 288)

Defensive tackles
58 David Parry –  Senior
79 Alex Yazdi –  Junior
95 Lance Callihan –  Junior

Defensive ends
 7 Aziz Shittu – Senior (6'3, 275)
17 Brennan Scarlett –  Senior (6'4, 265)
48 Kevin Anderson –  Senior (6'4, 245)
55 Nate Lohn –  Junior (6'3, 274)
56 Wesley Annan – Freshman (6'4, 285)
66 Harrison Phillips – Sophomore (6'4, 255)
75 Jordan Watkins –  Junior (6'5, 271)
90 Solomon Thomas - Sophomore (6'3, 256)
97 Dylan Jackson –  Freshman (6'6, 248)

Linebackers
 3 Noor Davis –  Junior (6'4, 227) ILB
 4 Blake Martinez – Senior (6'2, 238) ILB
15 Jordan Perez –  Freshman (6'2, 207) ILB
20 Bobby Okereke -  Freshman (6'3, 217) ILB
27 Sean Barton – Freshman (6'3, 212) ILB
31 Mustafa Branch – Freshman (5'11, 218) ILB
32 Joey Alfieri –  Freshman (6'3, 228) OLB 
33 Mike Tyler –  Sophomore (6'5, 225) OLB
34 Peter Kalambayi –  Sophomore (6'3, 240) OLB
43 Ryan Beecher– Freshman (6'1, 230) ILB
44 Kevin Palma –  Sophomore (6'2, 240) ILB
47 Sam Yules –  Junior (6'2, 221) ILB
49 Lewis Burik– Freshman (5'10, 216) ILB
50 Sam Shober–  Junior (6'3, 223) OLB
52 Casey Toohill – Freshman (6'4, 230) OLB
53 Torsten Rotto –  Senior (6'2, 240) OLB
59 Craig Jones –  Junior (6'0, 215) ILB
86 Lane Veach –  Freshman (6'6, 233) OLB

|width="25"| 
|valign="top"|

Defensive backs
 8 Frank Buncom – Freshman (6'2, 192) CB
11 Terrence Alexander - Sophomore (5'10, 178) CB
13 Alijah Holder -  Freshman (6'2, 174) CB
21 Ronnie Harris –  Senior (5'10, 170) CB
23 Alameen Murphy -  Freshman (5'11, 185) CB
24 Quenton Meeks – 'Freshman (6'2, 195) CB
38 Ra'Chard Pippens –  Senior (6'2, 198) CB

Safeties
 2 Brandon Simmons –  Freshman (6'0, 182) FS
 9 Ben Edwards – Freshman (6'0, 191) FS
22 Justin Reid – Junior (6'1, 195) SS
28 Denzel Franklin –  Sophomore (6'0, 198) SS
29 Dallas Lloyd –  Junior (6'3, 209) SS
45 Calvin Chandler –  Sophomore (6'2, 215) SS

Punters/Kickers
14 Jake Bailey – Freshman (6'2 186) P
27 Charlie Beall – Freshman (6'2 215) K
34 Conrad Ukropina –  Junior (6'1 185) K
47 Alex Robinson –  Sophomore (6'0 200) P

Long snappers
67 Reed Miller – Senior (6'2, 222)68 C.J. Keller - Sophomore (6'3, 215)''

Terms:
Freshman – A player in his first year.
Sophomore – A player in his second year.
Junior – A player in his third year.
Senior – A player in his fourth year.
 Redshirt – A player who sat out a previous season.
|-
|colspan="7"|Source: 2015 Stanford Cardinal Football Roster
|}

Schedule

Game summaries
at Northwestern

UCF

at #6 USC

at Oregon State

Arizona

#18 UCLA

Washington

at Washington State

at Colorado

Oregon

California

No. 4 Notre Dame

In arguably one of the best college football games of the year, a game that had ten lead changes and almost 1,000 yards of offense, Stanford scored five touchdowns in five red zone trips, but it would be Stanford Kicker Conrad Ukropina who hit the game-winning field goal as time expired, which also ended Notre Dame's College Football Playoff hopes while keeping Stanford's playoff hopes alive. With 6:48 left in the game and the Cardinal leading 35-29, the Irish would march 88 yards in 15 plays (using up 6:18 of the play clock). It was capped off by Notre Dame Quarterback DeShone Kizer's two-yard touchdown run to give the Irish the lead with just 30 seconds left in the game. But the Irish defense could not hold as Stanford would go 45 yards in just 28 seconds and finish off the game with the win from Ukropina's field goal.

vs. #24 USC (Pac-12 Championship)

vs. #6 Iowa (Rose Bowl)

Sports analysts had anticipated the contest to be exciting, due mainly to the matchup between Iowa's strong run defense and Stanford running back Christian McCaffrey, the Heisman Trophy runner-up. McCaffrey led the FBS in the 2015 season with 3,864 all-purpose yards, which came from punt/kick returns, runs from scrimmage, and passes out of the backfield. In contrast, Iowa's run defense finished the season ranked 14th, allowing only 121 yards per game and having defeated historically rushing teams like Wisconsin, Indiana, and Nebraska.

McCaffrey caught a short pass and turned it into a 75-yard touchdown on the first play from scrimmage. The Hawkeyes were unable to stop him, as he averaged 9.6 YPC (172 yards on 18 carries), returned a punt for a touchdown, and converted many third downs. Though he did not rush for any touchdowns from scrimmage, he proved to be the primary playmaker for Stanford, catching a third of Cardinal Quarterback Kevin Hogan's twelve passes. McCaffrey was such an offensive threat that Hogan was able to make large gains with the read option, including a wide-open first-quarter option TD run.

Stanford's 21-0 first-quarter lead was the most first-quarter points scored by one team in Rose Bowl history. Stanford shut Iowa out in the first half 35-0, with Stanford's 35 points the most scored in the first half of a Rose Bowl in its entire 102-year history. McCaffrey gained a total of 368 all-purpose yards, setting another Rose Bowl record.

Iowa was unable to get their run game going, rushing as a team for 1.3 YPC (48 yards on 38 carries). The longest Iowa runs were 14 and 12 yards, as well as a 14-yard scramble by Quarterback C. J. Beathard. Iowa's inability to establish a run game closed up Iowa's potential for play-action passing, which had been Beathard's bread and butter all season. Iowa's halfbacks, their biggest threat all season, were overall unable to garner any significant yardage on the ground.

By the second half, Stanford's explosiveness slowed down, scoring just 10 second-half points versus their 35 first-half points. Iowa did not score until the 3rd quarter when placekicker Marshall Koehn kicked a field goal after converting on 4th down earlier in the drive; Beathard threw 2 touchdowns in the 4th quarter, with Koehn missing one of the two PATs.

Iowa had a slight advantage in time of possession, possessing the ball for almost 33 minutes, though they were simply unable to make meaning out of their possessions. Iowa also outgained Stanford through the air by a slim margin, with 239 yards to Stanford's 223.

Rankings

Statistics

TeamAll opponentsPac-12 opponentsNon-conference opponents'''

Players drafted into the NFL

References

Stanford
Stanford Cardinal football seasons
Pac-12 Conference football champion seasons
Rose Bowl champion seasons
Stanford Cardinal football